95 Miles to Go is a 2004 comedy film directed by Tom Caltabiano. It stars Ray Romano, and documents his stand-up comedy tour of the South. The film premiered at the Deep Ellum Film Festival in October 2004 and released theatrically in the United Statesin April 2006 by THINKFilm.  It premiered on HBO on July 10, 2007.

The DVD of the film was released on May 22, 2012, by Video Services Corporation, a film distribution company located in Toronto, Canada.

External links 
 
 
 Review of 95 Miles to Go on Variety.com

2004 films
2004 comedy films
Films shot in Savannah, Georgia
2000s English-language films